This is a list of notable Dutch Turks. It includes Dutch citizens of full or partial Turkish ancestry.

Academia 
, professor at Bilkent University
Uğur Ümit Üngör, scholar of genocide studies

Actvisim
, ambassador of the Dutch Autism Association 
, feminist

Arts and literature
 
, writer
, journalist
Sevtap Baycılı, novelist
Sedat Çakır, writer
Altan Erdogan, former editor of the Dutch weekly magazine Nieuwe Revu
:nl:Özkan Gölpinar, publicist for Trouw, De Groene Amsterdammer and Contrast
Halil Gür, novelist
Hatice Guleryuz, contemporary artist
Mehmet Refii Kileci, artist
Ahmet Ögüt, conceptual artist
, journalist and editor-in-chief of SEN Magazine
, journalist
Ebru Umar, columnist
Sadık Yemni, science fiction author

Business
, businesswoman
Nedim Imac, businessman and former chairman of the Amsterdam football club Türkiyemspor
Erdinç Saçan, internet entrepreneur

Cinema and television

Azra Akın, actress, singer and winner of Miss Turkey 2002 and Miss World 2002
, actress and winner of Miss Nederland 2008
Evrim Akyigit, actress 
Elvan Akyıldız, actress
Pinar Arslan, crowned Miss Gelderland in 2011 and placed 4th in Miss Nederland  2011
, documentary maker   
, actor  
, actor
, film director, screenwriter and actor
Hayat Van Eck, actor
, presenter and documentary maker 
, actress
Sevtap Ergec, placed 5th in Miss Nederland 2010
, actor 
, actress
, actress
, vlogger on YouTube and documentary maker
, film director 
, actress 
, winner of Miss Turkey 1992 and mother of Miss Turkey 2018 Tara De Vries
, TV Presenter
, TV Presenter
, actress
, actor
Nazmiye Oral, actress and writer 
Cahit Ölmez, actor
Melisa Aslı Pamuk, actress and winner of Miss Turkey 2011
, actress 
,  filmmaker  
,  actor 
Gamze Tazim, actress
Nazlı Tolga, television host and model
Tara De Vries, winner of Miss Turkey 2018
, documentary maker
, filmmaker
, actress  
, actress
, actress

Music

Sinan Akçıl, singer-songwriter and record producer
Ufuk Çalışkan, singer 
, folk musician
, composer 
Atiye Deniz, singer
Selim Doğru, pianist 
Karsu Dönmez, singer, pianist and composer
,  saxophonist 
Joan Franka, singer who represented the Netherlands at the Eurovision Song Contest 2012
Altın Gün, Anatolian rock and Turkish Psychedelic Folk band
Burak King, rapper, songwriter and musician
, rapper
Murda, rapper
, singer
Ummet Ozcan,  DJ and record producer 
Taylan Susam, composer of experimental music
Umut Timur, singer  
Turk, rapper
, singer
Behsat Üvez, singer and composer
 , disc jockey and music producer (Turkish father)
Burak Yeter,  DJ, record producer and remixer

Religion
, chairman of Aya Sofia

Politics

Nebahat Albayrak,  member of the PvdA
, member of the PvdA 
Mahir Alkaya, member of the SP
Stephan van Baarle, member of DENK
Ali Osman Biçen
Emine Bozkurt, Member of the European Parliament (2004 and 2014) and member of the PvdA
Yasemin Cegerek, member of the PvdA
Metin Çelik, former member of the PvdA, current chairman of DENK 
Coşkun Çörüz, member of the CDA
Kemal Derviş, economist and politician
Nihat Eski, member of the CDA
Sultan Günal-Gezer member of the PvdA
Nilüfer Gündoğan, member of Volt
Hamit Karakus, member of the PvdA
Hülya Kat, member of the D66
Fatma Koşer Kaya, lawyer and a member of the D66
, councillor for participation and culture in the municipality of Rotterdam
Tunahan Kuzu, co-founder of DENK
, member of the PvdA
, member of the People's Party for Freedom and Democracy
Zihni Özdil, historian and member of GL
Selçuk Öztürk, co-founder of DENK
Nevin Özütok, member of GL
, councilor in Apeldoorn for the CDA
, member of the PvdA
Keklik Yücel, member of the PvdA

Sports

 
 
 

Rohat Agca, football player
Özgür Aktaş, football player
Furkan Alakmak, football player
, football player
Adnan Alisic, football player
Erol Erdal Alkan, football player 
, football player
Yener Arıca, football player
Ceylan Arıkan, football player
Deniz Aslan, football player 
Murat Aygün, kickboxer
Leyla Bağcı,  women's football goalkeeper
Emre Bal, football player
Yusuf Barasi, football player 
Bilal Başaçıkoğlu, football player
Ertugrul Bayrak, kickboxer 
Ömer Bayram, football player 
Emir Biberoğlu, football player 
Emre Bilgin, football player 
, football player 
Brian Bulgaç, road bicycle racer
Samet Bulut, football player
, football player
, football player
Caner Cavlan, football player
Hüseyin Cengiz, football player
, football player 
Serhat Çakmak, football player
Cihat Çelik, football player
Tolgahan Çiçek, football player
Nadir Çiftçi, football player
Halil Çolak, football player
Orhan Delibaş, boxer
Aykut Demir, football player
, football player
Halil Dervişoğlu, football player
Mehmet Dingil, football player
Huseyin Dogan, football player
, football coach
, football player
Ferdi Elmas, football player
Yasin Erdal, futsal player
Zeki Erkilinc, football player
Tarik Evre, football player 
Alper Göbel, football player
, football player
Doğan Gölpek, football player
Ferhat Görgülü, football player 
Serdar Gözübüyük, football referee
Ali Gunyar, kickboxer 
Engin Güngör, football player
Doğucan Haspolat, football player 
Ferdi Kadioglu, football player
Ekrem Kahya, football player
Fatih Kamaçi, football player
, football player
, football player 
, football player
, football player
Sinan Keskin, football player 
Ahmet Kilic, football player
Hasan Kılıç, football player
Shirley Kocaçınar, female football player
Serhat Koç, football player
Çağrı Kodalak, football player
Evren Korkmaz, football player
Mustafa Korkmaz, wheelchair basketball player and Paralympian
, football player 
Orkun Kökçü, football player
Ozan Kökçü, football player
Serhat Köksal, football player
Furkan Kurban, football player
Baki Mercimek, football player
Hursut Meric, football player
Hilmi Mihçi, football player
Muslu Nalbantoğlu, football player
Murat Önal, football player
Tufan Özbozkurt, football player 
Tayfun Özcan, kickboxer
, football player
, football player 
Alim Öztürk, football player 
Oğuzhan Özyakup, football player
Hatice Özyurt, kickboxer 
Hayri Pinarci, football player
, football player
Gökhan Saki, kickboxer and martial artist
, football player
Mustafa Saymak, football player 
Resit Schuurman, football player
Ömer Sepici, football player
Selman Sevinç, football player 
Fatih Sonkaya, football player
Mahmut Sönmez, football player 
Kürşad Sürmeli, football player 
, football player
Tunahan Taşçı, football player 
Elayis Tavşan, football player 
Esmeral Tunçluer, basketball player
Oğuzhan Türk, football player 
, football player 
Deniz Türüç, football player 
Ali Ulusoy, football player 
Fuat Usta, football player
Suat Usta, football player
Naci Ünüvar, football player 
Şahin Yakut, kickboxer
, football player
Özcan Yasar, football player
, football player
Atilla Yildirim, football player (Turkish German origin) 
Ismaïl Yıldırım, football player 
Murat Yıldırım, football player
Uğur Yıldırım, football player
Salih Yildiz, football player
, football player
, football player
Mustafa Yücedağ, football player
Ümran Zambak, football player
 Ferdi Kadıoğlu

Other 
Seyit Höçük, astrophysicist
Marti Sarigul-Klijn, US-based test pilot

See also 
List of Dutch people
Turks in the Netherlands

References

 
Dutch
Turkish